The Harghita Mountains (in Hungarian Hargita, in Romanian Munții Harghita) is a volcanic mountain range of the Căliman-Harghita Mountains in Harghita County of Romania, part of the Inner Eastern Carpathians.

References

Mountain ranges of Romania
Mountain ranges of the Eastern Carpathians